The 99th District of the Iowa House of Representatives in the state of Iowa.

Current elected officials
Lindsay James is the representative currently representing the district.

Past representatives
The district has previously been represented by:
 Floyd H. Millen, 1971–1973
 Dennis E. Butler, 1973–1975
 Emil S. Pavich, 1975–1983
 Michael Gronstal, 1983–1985
 Brent Siegrist, 1985–1993
 Clay Spear, 1993–1993
 Richard Larkin, 1993–2003
 Doug Struyk, 2003–2011
 Mary Ann Hanusa, 2011–2013
 Pat Murphy, 2013–2015
 Abby Finkenauer, 2015–2019
 Lindsay James, 2019–present

References

099